Danielle Serdachny (born May 12, 2001) is a Canadian All-American women's ice hockey player for Colgate.

Early life
Serdachny played two seasons for Pursuit of Excellence in the CSSHL. During her first season with the team she recorded 16 goals and 30 assists in 21 games. During her final season with the team she recorded 24 goals and 34 assists in 28 games. She won consecutive CSSHL Female Prep Division Championships and was named league MVP in the CSSHL.

Playing career

NCAA
Serdachny began her collegiate career for Colgate during the 2019–20 season. She made her debut for the Raiders on September 21, 2019, in a game against Holy Cross Crusaders where she recorded two goals. She became the first Raider in the past decade to score multiple goals in her first collegiate game. She was named the ECAC Rookie of the Week for the week ending February 10, 2020. She finished the season with 10 goals, 22 assists, one power play goal, one short-handed goal, two game-winning goals, and 69 shots on goal in 38 games. She tied a program record for assists in a season by a freshman. Following an outstanding season she was named to the ECAC All-Rookie team and Colgate women's hockey Rookie of the Year.

During the 2020–21 season she recorded nine goals, three game-winning goals, three power-play goals, 12 assists and a team-leading 21 points in 23 games. She led the team with six multi-point performances, and led all ECAC players in scoring with 13 points. She was named the ECAC Hockey Player of the Week for the week ending January 11, 2021, after she recorded three goals and one assist during the weekend. She was named the ECAC Hockey Player of the Week for the week ending March 1, 2021, her second Player of the Week honor. Following an outstanding season she was named first-team All-ECAC, ECAC Player of the Year, and ECAC Best Forward. She became the first Player of the Year recipient in Colgate program history. She was also named a First-Team All-USCHO and CCM/AHCA First-Team All-American. She became the first All-American for Colgate in the Division I history, and the first player to earn All-American honors since Heather Murphy won consecutive AWHCA Division III All-America First-Team honors in 2000 and 2001.

On July 14, 2021, Serdachny was named a captain for the 2021–22 season. During her junior year, she recorded 15 goals and 38 assists in 39 games. She recorded 28 points in league play, scoring nine goals and 19 assists. Following the season she was named second-team All-ECAC.

International play
Serdachny represented Canada at the 2019 IIHF World Women's U18 Championship where she recorded three goals and one assist in five games and won a gold medal.

Personal life
Danielle was born to Steven and Debra Serdachny. Her father was a skating/skills coach for the NHL's Edmonton Oilers for nine seasons.

Career statistics

Regular season and playoffs

International

Awards and honours

References

External links

2001 births
Living people
Canadian women's ice hockey forwards
Colgate Raiders women's ice hockey players
Ice hockey people from Edmonton